Hofsee is a lake at Speck, Kargow, Mecklenburgische Seenplatte, Mecklenburg-Vorpommern, Germany. At an elevation of 62.5 m, its surface area is 1.15 km².

Lakes of Mecklenburg-Western Pomerania